Chopin Theatre Productions is a 501(c)(3) not for profit art presenter and producer at the historic Chopin Theater building in Chicago. Chopin Theatre's 500+ annual theater, literary, music, film and social events are often avant-garde or international. Its mission is to promote enlightened civic discourse through a diverse range of artistic offerings.

Notable guests
Edward Auer, International Chopin Piano Competition  pianist
Gwendolyn Brooks, Pulitzer Prize winning poet
Peter Brötzmann, free jazz saxophonist and clarinetist
Mircea Cărtărescu, poet
David Cromer, MacArthur Fellows Program/"Genius Grant", director
John Cusack, actor and film producer
Chuck D, rapper and author
Urszula Dudziak, jazz vocalist
Stuart Dybek, MacArthur Fellows Program/"Genius Grant", author
Michael Eric Dyson, academic, author and radio host
Kurt Elling, jazz vocalist
Kahil El'Zabar, jazz multi-instrumentalist
Tony Fitzpatrick, visual artist
Von Freeman, jazz tenor saxophonist
Nikki Giovanni, award-winning poet, "living legend"
Fareed Haque, fusion guitar virtuoso
Aleksander Hemon, MacArthur Fellows Program/"Genius Grant", author
Ryszard Horowitz, photographer
Steve James, filmmaker, "Hoop Dreams"
Malalai Joya, activist, writer, former Afghan politician
Yusef Komunyakaa, Pulitzer Prize winning poet
Greg Kot, filmmaker, "Hoop Dreams"
Krzysztof Krauze, film director, cinematographer
Li-Young Lee, poet
Philip Levine, Pulitzer Prize poet
Haki Madhubuti, author
Adam Makowicz, pianist and composer
Rob Mazurek, cornetist and composer
Aaron McGruder, author, cartoonist, creator The Boondocks
Dominic Miller, guitarist (with Sting, Phil Collins)
Sara Paretsky, author
Ed Paschke, painter
Jeremy Piven, actor and film producer
Luis J. Rodriguez, poet
Art Shay, photographer
Charles Simic, Pulitzer Prize winning poet
Marc Smith, founder poetry slam movement
Zadie Smith, author of one of Time magazine's 100 best novels
Franciszek Starowieyski, visual artist
Studs Terkel, Pulitzer Prize winning author
Ken Vandermark, MacArthur Fellows Program/"Genius Grant", musician and composer
Paul Wertico, Grammy Award winner, drummer
Bronisław Wildstein, journalist
Adam Zagajewski, poet
Howard Zinn, historian, author and activist
Henryk Baranowski, Golden Mask award-winning theater and television director and designer

References

External links
 
 
 
 
 
 

Theatre companies in Chicago
Theatres in Chicago
West Side, Chicago
Polish-American culture in Chicago
Theatre festivals in the United States
Arts centers in Illinois